OOB may refer to:

Oob (Dragon Ball), a fictional character in Dragon Ball
off our backs, US feminist periodical 1970–2008
Order of battle, a listing of military units
Out-of-bag error, a method of measuring prediction error
Out-of-band management, using a dedicated management channel in computer networking
 ÖoB, a Swedish discount chain
 Old Orchard Beach, a seaside resort town in Maine

See also
OOBE (disambiguation)